The University of Mazandaran is a state university located in Mazandaran province of Iran, headquartered in the city of Babolsar.

The University of Mazandaran, currently the largest state higher education center in the north of Iran, and had formerly consisted of a number of tertiary education  In 1979 the centers were officially merged to form what is now known as University of Mazandaran.

The university has about 12,000 students who are currently studying at undergraduate, graduate, and post-graduate levels and over 350 faculty members teaching and researching at different faculties of the university.

History
Babolsar College of Economics and Social Sciences (مدرسه‌ عالي‌ علوم‌ اقتصادي‌ و اجتماعي‌ بابلسر) was founded in 1970 and then in 1979 was merged with College of Higher Education (دانشكده‌ تحصيلات‌ تكميلي) est. 1974, Babol Higher Technical School (دانشسراي عالي فني بابل) est. 1969, Sari College of Agriculture (مدرسه عالي كشاورزي ساري) est 1972, and Gorgan School of Natural Resources (مدرسه عالي منابع طبيعي گرگان) est. 1957, which later separated off into Gorgan University in 1986. After merging this colleges, a new name was given to these educational centers. University of Mazandaran became the official name ever since.

Harvard University contributed academically, administratively, and to the original design of the predecessor of University of Mazandaran, which at the time was known as "Reza Shah Kabir University" in the 1970s.

Currently
The university currently covers an area of 350 hectares, and operates 6 Faculties, offering numerous bachelor's degrees and twenty-six postgraduate programs in M.A, M.Sc and/or Ph.D levels.

Faculties

Faculty of Architecture & Art
 Year of establishment: 2003  * Location: Babolsar City, Main Campus  * Faculty members: 28  * Number of students: 754  * Degree Courses:  * BA: handicraft arts, architecture, urban development,  * MA: Art Research
Faculty of Basic Sciences
 Year of establishment: 1977  * Location: Babolsar, Main Campus  * Faculty members: 44  * Number of students: 1368  * Degree Courses:  - BSc: Cell and Molecular Biology, Plant Biology, Zoological Sciences,  Solid State Physics, Atomic and Molecular Physics, Nuclear Physics  - MSc: Systematic Biology, Plant Ecology, Animal Physiology, Solid State  Physics, Atomic and Molecular Physics, Nuclear Physics, Particle Physics,  Astronomy, Cell and Molecular Biology, Microbiology  - PhD.: Solid State Physics, Atomic and Molecular Physics, Nuclear Physics,  Particle Physics, Astronomy, NANO Physics, Cosmology
Faculty of Chemistry
 Year of establishment: 1978  * Location: Babolsar, Main Campus  * Faculty members: 29  * Number of students: 869  * Degree Courses:  * BSc: Applied Chemistry, and Pure Chemistry  * MSc: Analytical Chemistry, Organic Chemistry, Inorganic Chemistry,  Physical Chemistry, NANO Sciences and Technology  * Ph.D.: Chemistry-Physics: Polymer and Kinetic, Computational  Quantum, Electrochemistry Kinetic, Statistical Thermodynamics, Analytical  Chemistry, Chemometrics, Electrochemistry, Spectroscopy,  Separation, Organic Chemistry, Polymer Chemistry
Faculty of Economics & Administrative Science
Year of establishment: 2004  * Location: Babolsar Pardis Complex  * Faculty members: 35  * Number of students: 2570  * Degree Courses:  - BA: Accounting, Economic Sciences, Theoretical Economics, Commercial  Economics, Business Management, Industrial Management  - MA: Accounting, Economic Sciences, Administrative Management,  Business Management, Industrial Management  - Ph. D.: Islamic Economics, Public Economics, Financial Economics,  Econometrics, Development Economics, International Economics, Regional  Economics, Statistics and Management, Production and Operation.
Faculty of Engineering & Technology
 Year of establishment: 2007  * Location: Babolsar, Main Campus  * Faculty members: 24  * Number of students: 1332  * Degree Courses: B.Sc.:  IT Engineering, Computer Engineering-  Software, Chemical Engineering, and Civil Engineering  M.Sc.: Civil Engineering
Faculty of Culture Heritage, Handicraft and Tourism
 Year of establishment: 2003  * Location: Babolsar, Main Campus  * Degree Courses:  BA: Tourism Management, Anthropology
Faculty of Humanity & Social Science
 Year of establishment: 1981  * Location: Babolsar, Main Campus  * Faculty members: 74  * Number of students: 3006  * Degree Courses:  - BA: Geography and Urban planning, English Language  and Literature, Teaching English as a Foreign Language,  Arabic Language and Literature, Persian Language and  Literature, Russian Language Translation, Research in  Social Sciences, Anthropology, Education, Tourism Management.  - MSc: Teaching English as a Foreign Language, Geography  and Urban Planning, Physical Geography, Ecotourism, Arabic Language and Literature, Persian Language  and Literature, Social Sciences, Sociology, Youth Studies,  Educational Administration and Planning, Philosophy of  Education  * Ph.D.: Persian Language and Literature, Sociology, Social  Issues of Iran, Higher Education Development, Psychology
Faculty of Law & Political Science
 Year of establishment: 2005  * Location: Babolsar City, Main Campus  * Faculty members: 23  * Number of students: 1029  * Degree Courses:  * BA: law  * MA: Criminal law, public law, international relations, political sciences  * Ph.D.: criminal law and criminology, civil law
Faculty of Mathematical Sciences
 Year of establishment: 2009  * Location: Babolsar, Main Campus  * Faculty members: 29  * Number of students: 998  * Degree Courses:  - BSc: Statistics and its Applications, Pure Mathematics  Applied Mathematics, Computer Sciences,  - MSc: Mathematical Statistics, Pure Mathematics,  Analysis, Geometry, Applied Mathematics, Research in  Operation, Algebra, Numerical Analysis, Computer  Sciences,  - Ph.D.: Applied Mathematics (Numerical Analysis,  Research in Operation), Asymptotic Analysis, Ring and  Module, Pure Mathematics (Functional Applied  Analysis), Differential Operators, Operators Theory,  Algebraic, Graph Theory, Differential Geometric)
Faculty of Physical Education & Sport Sciences
 Year of establishment: 2005  * Location: Babolsar, Main Campus  * Faculty members: 17  * Number of students: 484  * Degree Courses:  - B.Sc.: Physical Education, Exercise Physiology,  Sports Management, Sports Biomechanics  - M.Sc.: Physical Education, Exercise Physiology,  Sports Management, Sports Biomechanics  - Ph.D.: Exercise Physiology, Sports Management,  Sports Biomechanics
Faculty of Theological Science 
This faculty first was established in 1970 as the Technical Teachers Training Institute of Babol. In 1979 it amalgamated with the University of Mazandaran and operated as University of Mazandaran Faculty of Engineering. In 2005, the process of independence from University of Mazandaran started and until March 2008 it was operated as Noshirvani Institute of Technology (Babol Noshiravani Technical and Education Complex). The graduated student of Mazandaran University in Engineering until 2012 were studied in Babol Babol Noshiravani Technical and Education Complex. Babol Noshirvani University of Technology
 Year of establishment: 2007
 Location: Babolsar, Main Campus
 Faculty members: 24  * Number of students: 1332  * Degree Courses: B.Sc.:  IT Engineering, Computer Engineering-  Software, Chemical Engineering, and Civil Engineering  M.Sc.: Civil Engineering
Faculty of Marine & Oceanic Sciences
Year of Establishment: 2002  Location: Babolsar, Main Campus  Faculty Members: 5  Number of Students: 46  Degree Courses:  MSc: Marine Chemistry, Marine  Biology, Marine Physics

Partner universities
In 2016, the university signed a partnership with Al-Beroni University to promote  faculty exchange and networking. 

  Al-Beroni University

See also
Higher education in Iran
Babol Noshirvani University of Technology
Shomal University
Gorgan University of Agricultural Sciences and Natural Resources
Allameh Mohaddes Nouri University
Habib Nafisi

References

External links

 

University of Mazandaran
Educational institutions established in 1979
Education in Mazandaran Province
1979 establishments in Iran
Buildings and structures in Mazandaran Province